The North Carolina Department of Transportation (NCDOT) is responsible for building, repairing, and operating highways, bridges, and other modes of transportation, including ferries in the U.S. state of North Carolina.

History
The North Carolina Department of Transportation was formed in 1915 as the State Highway Commission. In 1941 the Department of Motor Vehicles (DMV) was formed under the NCDoT by an act of the General Assembly. The Executive Organization Act of 1971 combined the state highway commission and the DMV to form the NC Department of Transportation and Highway Safety. In 1979 "Highway Safety" was dropped when the North Carolina State Highway Patrol (NCSHP) was transferred to the North Carolina Department of Crime Control and Public Safety.

Board of Transportation
The board governs the department and is the decision-making body. Fourteen board members are appointed by the governor, one each from one of the fourteen divisions, and six others appointed by the NC House Speaker and NC Senate Pro-Tempore, representing specific functions of the department that meet once a month.

Divisions of the NCDOT

Division of Motor Vehicles
The Division of Motor Vehicles (DMV) is a division of the NCDOT, some things the division does is, provide motor services like issuing licenses and permits, promote highway safety, giving accurate information about road conditions, enforcing motor vehicle laws, and keeping hold of official DMV records.

Division of Highways

Division of Aviation
The Division of Aviation's mission is to maintain the North Carolina air transportation system development and improve aviation safety and education.

Division of Bicycle & Pedestrian Transportation
The Division of Bicycle and Pedestrian Transportation (DBPT) is a division for Bicycles and pedestrian traffic. Some notable things the division does is designing facilities, creating safety programs, mapping cross-state bicycle routes, training teachers, sponsoring workshops and conferences, fostering multi-modal planning or integrating bicycling and walking into other projects by the Department of Transportation. Created in 1974 as a result of North Carolina bicycle program legislation and expanded to encompass pedestrian activities in 1992 as a result of federal legislation, the DBPT is the oldest comprehensive state program of its kind in the United States.

Ferry Division
The Ferry Division is responsible for providing ferry services to public. The Ferry Division operates eight routes connecting mainland North Carolina with various outer banks and islands along the coast of North Carolina.

Public Transportation Division
The NCDOT Public Transportation Division helps North Carolina public transit systems move people. The division does not operate buses, trains or vans directlythese services are operated by local transit systemsbut help maintain these public transit systems. The first division director was David C. Robinson, 1974–1979. He was succeeded by David King, then Sanford Cross, Miriam Perry, and Denese Lavandere (the current director, appointed in 2012.)

F59PH

Former Metrolink 853, 859, 867, 871 and 872 is sold from Metrolink to NCDOT RNCX is arrived here in 2024-2025 to North Carolina for 5 units.

Rail Division

The Rail Division is responsible for operation of six Amtrak trains within North Carolina under the NC By Train brand and works with the North Carolina Railroad Company, a state owned railroad that carries both freight and passenger rail service. The route passes through the cities of Charlotte, Salisbury, Lexington, Greensboro, Burlington, Durham, Raleigh,  Goldsboro and on to Morehead City. The North Carolina Railroad trackage is currently leased to Norfolk Southern Railway. A small portion between Raleigh and Cary is co-operated with Norfolk Southern by CSX Transportation. The state operates no freight trains and all freight is handled by either CSX or Norfolk Southern. However, the division does own the rolling stock used on the Piedmont under the reporting mark RNCX.

See also
North Carolina Ferry System
North Carolina Highway System
North Carolina Turnpike Authority
 Vehicle registration plates of North Carolina

References

External links

 NCDOT Official Site
 NCDOT Rail Division Official Site
 NCDOT Division of Motor Vehicles Official Site
 NCDOT Ferry Division Official Site
 NCDOT Division of Aviation Official Site
 Publications (historic and current) from NCDOT

Transportation
Transportation
Organizations based in Raleigh, North Carolina
Transportation in North Carolina
State departments of transportation of the United States
Motor vehicle registration agencies
Government agencies established in 1979
1979 establishments in North Carolina